Antoni Hawełka (17 January 1840 – 14 January 1894) was a Polish merchant and caterer, born in Kęty.

Biography
Hawełka was the founder of a well-known restaurant Pod Palmą (Under the Palm) on the Main Market Square in Kraków. He opened a colonial store first in 1876, at Rynek 46, and than moved to Krzysztofory Palace at Rynek 35 in order to expand his business, and added a restaurant to his already popular venue. Hawełka traded in the region, and outside of it as well. For his services he was given an imperial warrant and became a purveyor to the imperial court in Vienna.

He also donated money to the renovation of the Chapel of St. Anthony in St. Mary's Basilica, Kraków. A memorial plaque was placed on the right side of the altar.

He was laid to rest in Rakowicki Cemetery.

See also
 Café Noworolski
 Jama Michalika
 Wierzynek

References

1840 births
1894 deaths
Businesspeople from Kraków
Purveyors to the Imperial and Royal Court
People from Oświęcim County
Burials at Rakowicki Cemetery